Michael Kazin (born June 6, 1948) is an American historian, and professor at Georgetown University. He is co-editor of Dissent magazine.

Early life
Kazin was born in New York City in 1948 and was raised in Englewood, New Jersey. He is the son of literary critic Alfred Kazin, and step-son of structural engineer Mario Salvadori.

He graduated from Dwight-Englewood School in 1966 and received the school's Distinguished Alumni Award in 2006. He received a B.A. in Social Studies from Harvard, an M.A. in History from Portland State University, and a Ph.D. in History from Stanford. As a Harvard student he was a leader in Students for a Democratic Society.

Career
Kazin's main research interests are American social movements and politics of the 19th and 20th centuries. He has authored books on labor history (Barons of Labor); populism (The Populist Persuasion) and a biography of William Jennings Bryan, (A Godly Hero). He is also co-author (with Maurice Isserman) of America Divided, now in its sixth edition; American Dreamers and War Against War: The American Fight for Peace, 1914-1918. Barons of Labor was awarded the Herbert Gutman Prize in 1988, and War Against War won the award for the best book in peace history published in 2017 and 2018 from the Peace History Society.

Kazin has written numerous reviews and articles for such periodicals as The New York Times, The Washington Post, The New York Review of Books, The New Republic, and The Nation.

He has won fellowships from the Guggenheim Foundation, the Institute for Advanced Study, and the National Endowment for the Humanities, among others. Kazin has been a Fulbright scholar in the Netherlands and Japan. He has twice been a member of the Pulitzer Prize jury for biography and autobiography. In 2020, he was elected to the American Academy of Arts and Sciences.

Kazin is a member of the Democratic Socialists of America. In an article for the Fall 2019 issue of Dissent magazine, Kazin argues that strategic collaboration between liberals and leftists is essential for the realization of a progressive political program. He wrote that "no Democrat will win the presidency in 2020 unless she or he can mobilize a broad coalition in which socialists would still be a distinct minority. In the United States, a strategic alliance between liberals and leftists is the only way durable changes have ever been won ... Abolitionists who joined the Republican Party drove Radical Reconstruction; union activists with socialist convictions helped make the Democrats a semblance of a labor party in big industrial states; the black freedom movement worked with white liberals to pass the Civil Rights and Voting Rights Acts. Such coalitions were short-lived and frustrated radicals who wanted more far-reaching results. But when liberals and leftists remained at odds, as during the final decades of the past century, they made it easier for the right to triumph."

Books 

 Barons of Labor: The San Francisco Building Trades and Union Power in the Progressive Era, University of Illinois Press, 1987
 The Populist Persuasion: An American History, Basic Books, 1995
 America Divided: The Civil War of the 1960s (co-author, Maurice Isserman), Oxford University Press, 1999
 A Godly Hero: The Life of William Jennings Bryan, Alfred A. Knopf, 2006
 American Dreamers: How the Left Changed a Nation, Alfred A. Knopf, August 2011
 War Against War: The American Fight for Peace, 1914-1918 , Simon and Schuster, 2017
 What It Took to Win: A History of the Democratic Party, Farrar, Straus and Giroux, 2022

Personal life 
Kazin married physician Beth C. Horowitz in 1980. They have two children, Danny, born in 1988, and Maia, born in 1991.

Notes

References
Michael Kazin, The Populist Persuasion: An American History, Cornell University Press, 1998, p. 222–224.

External links

with Michael Kazin  by Stephen McKiernan, Binghamton University Libraries Center for the Study of the 1960s, February 12, 2011

1948 births
Labor historians
American male non-fiction writers
Dwight-Englewood School alumni
Georgetown University faculty
Harvard University alumni
Historiographers
Jewish American historians
Living people
Members of the Democratic Socialists of America
Portland State University alumni
Stanford University alumni
Writers from New York City
Jewish socialists
Members of the Weather Underground
American left-wing activists
Political historians
Left-wing populism in the United States
Populism scholars
American biographers
Historians from New York (state)